Reiner is a lunar impact crater on the Oceanus Procellarum, in the western part of the Moon. It has a nearly circular rim, but appears oval in shape due to foreshortening. The rim edge is well-defined and has not been eroded by impacts. In the midpoint of the irregular crater floor is a central peak. Outside the rim is a hummocky rampart that extends out across the mare for about half a crater diameter.

To the west-northwest of the crater on the Oceanus Procellarum is the unusual feature Reiner Gamma, a fish-shaped surface marking of ray-like material with a high albedo.

Satellite craters
By convention these features are identified on lunar maps by placing the letter on the side of the crater midpoint that is closest to Reiner.

References

 
 
 
 
 
 
 
 
 
 
 
 

Impact craters on the Moon